Beautiful Kate is a 2009 Australian drama film directed by Rachel Ward and starring Ben Mendelsohn, Rachel Griffiths, Bryan Brown, Maeve Dermody and Sophie Lowe. Ward adapted the script from a 1982 novel of the same name by Newton Thornburg; this was the first novel by Thornburg used for a movie since Cutter's Way (1981). The film was shot on location in the Flinders Ranges.

The film premiered in June 2009 at the Sydney Film Festival and was released in limited release across Australia on 6 August 2009.

Plot
Writer Ned Kendall is returning to the remote and isolated family home inhabited by his sister Sally, to say goodbye to his father, Bruce, who is dying. Ned also brings his fiancée, Toni, who has trouble getting used to the isolation and harshness of rural Australia.

Ned starts reliving memories of his childhood, many involving his beautiful twin sister Kate, and his older brother Cliff. These memories awaken long-buried secrets from the family's past. He begins writing, and his fiancée reads that he had an awkward sexual encounter with Kate, and leaves him without giving him a chance to explain.

Kate continues to entice Ned despite his obvious revulsion, and after a drunken night out with friends, Ned goes for a swim in the family dam. He is joined by Kate, who seduces and subsequently has sex with him on the banks of the dam. Ned shows immediate remorse while Kate remains unperturbed.

After Ned's refusal to have further sexual relations with Kate, Kate instigates a fight between the brothers by suggesting that Ned made unwanted advances towards her. As punishment, Bruce makes Ned accompany Kate to the Christmas dance. During the dance, Ned leaves Kate, and she is left to go home with Cliff. Ned leaves separately and on his way home he finds his sister's dead body in Cliff's crashed car, and then finds that Cliff has hanged himself.

Fearing that Ned will tell Bruce the truth about Kate, Sally reveals that she knew of Ned and Kate's secret. She also reveals that the car's clock stopped on impact of the crash and no one could figure out what took Kate and Cliff so long to get home from the dance. Sally speculates that Kate also had sexual relations with Cliff, who then crashed the car in which Kate died. She tells Ned she believes that Cliff's guilt from his part in Kate's death was multiplied knowing he had committed incest. But Bruce still believes that Kate was an innocent victim, the best of his children, and she doesn't want him shattered with the truth.

Ned then makes amends with Bruce and says that he is sorry for blaming him over Cliff's suicide. He doesn't tell Bruce the truth about Kate and lets him die still believing that Kate was everything he thought she was. Before he leaves, he tells Sally that Bruce died never knowing that she was his greatest achievement.

Cast
 Ben Mendelsohn as Ned Kendall
 Rachel Griffiths as Sally Kendall
 Bryan Brown as Bruce Kendall
 Sophie Lowe as Kate Kendall
 Maeve Dermody as Toni
 Josh McFarlane as Cliff Kendall
 Scott O'Donnell as Young Ned
 Heloise Baker as Young Sally

Release

Beautiful Kate screened at the Antipodean Film Festival in Saint Tropez, France, in October 2010, and was released in 29 cinemas in Australia.

Reception

Box office
Until the debut of the Paul Hogan-starring Charlie & Boots in early September, Beautiful Kate held the title of the largest opening weekend for an Australian film for 2009.

Critical response
The film holds an 83% approval rating on Rotten Tomatoes based on 30 reviews with an average rating of 6.8 out of 10.

Beautiful Kate received four and a half stars from both Margaret Pomeranz and David Stratton on At The Movies. Sandra Hall of The Sydney Morning Herald rated it four and a half stars out of five and wrote, "At times the action slows to the point where escape seems the most enticing option. Don't take it, for Ward's tough-minded and uniquely Australian version of Southern Gothic does reward your perseverance by at last making you care." Richard Kuipers of Variety called it "a visually beautiful and emotionally rewarding study of a dying patriarch and his estranged son". Megan Lehmann of The Hollywood Reporter described it as "a provocative slice of Southern Gothic refried Aussie-style". Frank Hatherley of Screen Daily wrote that it is a "handsome and intense love story" that is "awash with Ward's own spiky, brittle dialogue, delivered with relish by her cast". Philip French of The Guardian wrote, "The film is well acted but both blunt and awkward." Also writing in The Guardian, Steve Rose rated it two out of four stars and said that it "doesn't do a great deal wrong, but despite broaching taboo subjects, feels too arthouse-by-numbers".

Accolades

Soundtrack

Track listing
 "Beautiful Kate (Main Theme)" - 3:20
 "Wilpena Pound" - 1:45
 "The Shed" - 0:33
 "Weeping Windmill" - 2:32
 "The Old School Room" - 1:10
 "The Memory" - 1:18
 "Room Service" - 1:33
 "Beautiful Kate (Kiss and Make Up)" - 0:59
 "The Chase" - 2:23
 "Ned Walks Back" - 1:28
 "Always On My Mind"/"Finding Kate" (with Blind Dog Taylor and One More Mile) - 3:01
 "Beautiful Kate (The Dam)" - 1:04
 "You're Not Gonna Tell Him Are You?" - 1:16
 "Forgiveness" - 0:57
 "Washing Bruce" - 1:46
 "Beautiful Kate (Goodbye)" - 1:17
 "This Little Bird" - 1:58
 "Closing Titles (Remembering Russell Dunlop)" - 5:34

All tracks written and performed by Tex Perkins and Murray Paterson, except track 11 which was written by Johnny Christopher, Mark James, Wayne Carson Thompson, Perkins and Paterson and track 17 which was written by John D. Loudermilk.

See also
 Cinema of Australia

References

External links
 

2009 films
2009 drama films
Australian drama films
Films based on American novels
Films set in Australia
Films shot in Flinders Ranges
Incest in film
Juvenile sexuality in films
Films about siblings
Films about dysfunctional families
2009 directorial debut films
2000s English-language films